Cordyligaster is a genus of bristle flies in the family Tachinidae.

Species
Cordyligaster analis (Macquart, 1851)
Cordyligaster ategulata Townsend, 1915
Cordyligaster capellii Fleming & Wood, 2014
Cordyligaster fuscifacies Bigot, 1888
Cordyligaster fuscipennis (Macquart, 1851)
Cordyligaster minuscula Wulp, 1891
Cordyligaster nyomula Townsend, 1914
Cordyligaster petiolata (Wiedemann, 1830)
Cordyligaster septentrionalis Townsend, 1909
Cordyligaster tipuliformis Walker, 1858
Cordyligaster townsendi Guimarães, 1971

References

Dexiinae
Tachinidae genera
Diptera of North America
Diptera of South America
Taxa named by Pierre-Justin-Marie Macquart